Skansin is a historic fortress in Tórshavn, the capital of the Faroe Islands.

Skansin is located on a hill beside the port of Tórshavn. The fort was built in 1580 by Magnus Heinason to protect against pirate raids of the town, after he himself was nearly caught up in one such raid. The fort was expanded considerably in 1780 and went through a series of rebuilds for many years afterwards. During the Second World War the fort served Britain as a military base. Two 5.5 inch guns date from the British occupation, standing along with many older Danish cannons.

One of the Faroese lighthouses, the Skansin Lighthouse (Skansin international lighthouse), towers over the fortress, pointing the way to the capital. The strategic location of the fort offers views of Tórshavn port, surrounding landscape and views out towards Nólsoy island.

Gallery

See also 
 British occupation of the Faroe Islands

External links 
 (Source) - Forts of the Faroe Islands
 Faroeislands.dk - Foto

Tórshavn
History of the Faroe Islands
Military installations of Denmark
Military installations closed in the 1940s